Günter Bentele (born 24 March 1948 in Heimenkirch) is professor of Public Relations at the University of Leipzig. Between 1989 and 1994 he taught at the University of Bamberg.

External links
 University of Leipzig: Prof Dr Günter Bentele

1948 births
Living people
German semioticians
Academic staff of the University of Bamberg
Academic staff of Leipzig University
People from Lindau (district)
Free University of Berlin alumni